Northern Black Forest Region (Region Nordschwarzwald) is an administrative unit in the Karlsruhe region (Regierungsbezirk Karlsruhe) of the  southwestern German state of Baden-Württemberg. Its area covers Pforzheim and the districts of Calw, Enzkreis, and Freudenstadt in the northeastern part of the Black Forest.

External links
 Homepage (in German)

Planning regions in Baden-Württemberg